Anders Lysgaard (15 August 1756 – 24 May 1827) was a Norwegian farmer and sheriff. He was a representative at the Norwegian Constituent Assembly at Eidsvoll.

Anders Eriksen Lysgaard was born in the parish of Tretten in Øyer in Oppland, Norway. He was the youngest of seven children born into a farming family in the traditional region of Gudbrandsdal.  His family lived on the farm Jevne in Øyer. Anders Lysgaard was appointed sheriff under the magistrate of Ringsaker in Hedmark from 1782 to 1786. Anders Lysgaard was married in 1786 with Ingeborg Larsdatter Svennes (1771-1858) and took over Svennes, a sizable farm near the village of Biri.

He represented Christians amt (now Oppland) at the Norwegian Constituent Assembly at Eidsvoll in 1814 where he favored the independence party (Selvstendighetspartiet). He was later a member of the Parliament of Norway.

References

1756 births
1827 deaths
Norwegian farmers
Politicians from Gjøvik
Fathers of the Constitution of Norway
Members of the Storting
People from Øyer